James Davies (born 25 October 1990) is a Welsh rugby union player who plays for the Scarlets as a flanker. He has also represented Wales Sevens and was part of the Great Britain squad that played in the Rugby Sevens tournament at the 2016 Summer Olympics.

Davies made his debut for the Scarlets in 2014 making 23 appearances in his debut season, 16 in the Pro12, scoring four tries and winning four man of the match awards.

His brother is Jonathan Davies, who also plays professional rugby union as a centre for Scarlets and Wales. His nickname is "Cubby", in reference to his brother's nickname, "Fox"; this refers to the Fox & Hounds pub their parents ran in Bancyfelin, the village where they grew up.

In January 2018 Davies was called up to the senior Wales squad for the 2018 Six Nations Championship. He made his international debut on 11 March 2018 against Italy.

In April 2022 it was announced that Davies would retire from rugby with immediate effect due to concussion. His final rugby match was Wales vs Georgia in October 2020.

International tries

References

External links
 
 Profile at scarlets.co.uk

Welsh rugby union players
Wales international rugby union players
Scarlets players
Living people
1990 births
Rugby sevens players at the 2016 Summer Olympics
Olympic rugby sevens players of Great Britain
Great Britain national rugby sevens team players
Olympic silver medallists for Great Britain
Olympic medalists in rugby sevens
Medalists at the 2016 Summer Olympics
Welsh rugby sevens players
Rugby union players from Carmarthen
Male rugby sevens players
Rugby sevens players at the 2014 Commonwealth Games
Commonwealth Games rugby sevens players of Wales
Rugby union flankers